Kawęczyn may refer to the following places:
Kawęczyn, Inowrocław County in Kuyavian-Pomeranian Voivodeship (north-central Poland)
Kawęczyn, Toruń County in Kuyavian-Pomeranian Voivodeship (north-central Poland)
Kawęczyn, Janów Lubelski County in Lublin Voivodeship (east Poland)
Kawęczyn, Piotrków County in Łódź Voivodeship (central Poland)
Kawęczyn, Radomsko County in Łódź Voivodeship (central Poland)
Kawęczyn, Skierniewice County in Łódź Voivodeship (central Poland)
Kawęczyn, Tomaszów Mazowiecki County in Łódź Voivodeship (central Poland)
Kawęczyn, Opole Lubelskie County in Lublin Voivodeship (east Poland)
Kawęczyn, Ryki County in Lublin Voivodeship (east Poland)
Kawęczyn, Świdnik County in Lublin Voivodeship (east Poland)
Kawęczyn, Zamość County in Lublin Voivodeship (east Poland)
Kawęczyn, Busko County in Świętokrzyskie Voivodeship (south-central Poland)
Kawęczyn, Jędrzejów County in Świętokrzyskie Voivodeship (south-central Poland)
Kawęczyn, Subcarpathian Voivodeship (south-east Poland)
Kawęczyn, Garwolin County in Masovian Voivodeship (east-central Poland)
Kawęczyn, Gmina Konstancin-Jeziorna in Masovian Voivodeship (east-central Poland)
Kawęczyn, Gmina Tarczyn in Masovian Voivodeship (east-central Poland)
Kawęczyn, Sochaczew County in Masovian Voivodeship (east-central Poland)
Kawęczyn, Turek County in Greater Poland Voivodeship (west-central Poland)
Kawęczyn, Września County in Greater Poland Voivodeship (west-central Poland)
Kawęczyn, Podkarpackie Voivodeship in Mielec County in Podkarpackie Voivodeship (southeast Poland)
Kawęczyn Sędziszowski in Ropczyce-Sędziszów County in Podkarpackie Voivodeship (southeast Poland)
 , within Rembertów, Warsaw